Jacqueline West is an American costume designer whose work has been recognized in numerous films such as Quills (2000), The League of Extraordinary Gentlemen (2003), The Curious Case of Benjamin Button (2008), State of Play (2009), The Tree of Life (2011), Seventh Son (2014), The Revenant (2015), and Dune (2021).

West was a fashion designer in the San Francisco Bay Area, with her own clothing stores in Berkeley, California, including her "Identikit by Jacqueline West" line.  Her first film work was for Philip Kaufman on Henry & June (1990). Brad Pitt has called her a "method costumer" after working with her in The Curious Case of Benjamin Button. West has said she was heavily influenced by her mother, who was an avant garde fashion designer in the 1940s and 1950s.

Filmography

Nominations and awards
 2021 Nominated 94th Academy Awards Best Costume Design for: Dune (2021)
 2015 Nominated 88th Academy Awards Best Costume Design for: The Revenant (2015)
 2011 Won Satellite Award Best Costume Design for: Water for Elephants (2011)
 2009 Nominated 81st Academy Awards Best Costume Design for: The Curious Case of Benjamin Button (2008)
 2009 Nominated 62nd British Academy Film Awards Best Costume Design for: The Curious Case of Benjamin Button (2008)
 2009 Nominated Costume Designers Guild Awards 2008 for Period Film Costumes for: The Curious Case of Benjamin Button (2008)
 2009 Nominated Satellite Award Best Costume Design for: The Curious Case of Benjamin Button (2008)
 2004 Nominated 30th Saturn Awards Best Costume Design for: The League of Extraordinary Gentlemen (2003)
 2001 Nominated 73rd Academy Awards Best Costume Design for: Quills (2000)
 2001 Nominated PFCS Award Best Costume Design for: Quills (2000)
 2000 Nominated BAFTA Award for Best Costume Design for: Quills (2000)

Footnotes

External links

American costume designers
Women costume designers
Living people
Year of birth missing (living people)